Thitarodes namensis is a species of moth of the family Hepialidae. It is found in China.

References

Moths described in 2004
Hepialidae